Out of Sight was a British children's television programme  airing on CITV between 7 November 1996 and 10 December 1998. The series ran for 3 seasons and 27 episodes and made by Central Independent Television, the producers of Woof!.  It was written by Richard Carpenter and directed by David Cobham.

Story
The 12-year-old boy genius Joseph (Joe) Lucas discovers an experiment in an old diary and a copy of The Invisible Man by H. G. Wells. With the help of a friend (Ali Pantajali) he recreates the experiment and makes a substance to turn people and things invisible by simply spraying it with the trademark green-bottled solution. The effects are reverted, whether intentionally or not, by the appliance of water or by waiting for a couple of minutes.
Joe decides not to tell anybody except Ali of his invention. This is the reason for some strange moments for Joe and his family.

Cast
 Shane Fox as Joe Lucas
 Moira Brooker as Mrs. Lucas
 Simon Pearsall as Jim Lucas
 Tom Aldwinckle as Shane Lucas
 Akabar Karim as Ali Pantajali (season 1)
 Sacha Dhawan as Ali Pantajali (season 2 and 3)

External links
 

ITV children's television shows
1996 British television series debuts
1998 British television series endings
1990s British children's television series
Fiction about invisibility
Television series by ITV Studios
Television shows produced by Central Independent Television
English-language television shows